Leonard Krumov (Sesto San Giovanni, 1 May 1996) is an Italian rugby union  player.
His usual position is as a Lock and he currently plays for Zebre in Pro14.

After playing for Italy Under 20 in 2015 and 2016, in November 2016 and June 2017 Krumov was named in the Emerging Italy squad for the Nations Cup. On the 14 October 2021, he was selected by Alessandro Troncon to be part of an Italy A 28-man squad for the 2021 end-of-year rugby union internationals.

References

External links
It's Rugby France Profile
Profile Player
ESPN Profile
All Rugby Profile

1996 births
Living people
People from Sesto San Giovanni
Italian rugby union players
Rugby union locks
Rugby Viadana players
Zebre Parma players